BZ may refer to:

Chemistry
 Belousov–Zhabotinsky reaction, example of non-equilibrium thermodynamics
 3-Quinuclidinyl benzilate, an odorless military incapacitating agent with NATO code BZ
 Benzimidazole, an aromatic compound and parasiticide
 Benzodiazepines, a class of psychoactive drugs
 Benzoyl, group (Bz), C6H5-CO-, a functional group: acyl derived from benzoic acid
 Bronze, an alloy consisting of (Cu) Copper and (Sn) tin

Entertainment
 B'z, a Japanese musical group
 Blue Zone (band), credited as "B.Z." for the 1998 cover of the song "Jackie" by Joanne Accom
 Beyond Zork, a computer game released by Infocom in 1987
 Border Zone (video game)

Periodicals
 Badische Zeitung, Freiburg(Germany)
 Braunschweiger Zeitung, Braunschweig
 B.Z. (newspaper), Berlin
 Berliner Zeitung, also Berlin
 Berner Zeitung, Bern
 Byzantinische Zeitschrift, a German academic journal

Places
 Bautzen, Germany (vehicle registration code BZ) 
 Belize (ISO 3166-1 2-letter country code)
 Province of Bolzano or South Tyrol, Italy (vehicle registration code BZ)
 Brazil (World Meteorological Organization country code)
 Buitenzorg or Bogor, West Java province, Indonesia
 Buzău, Romania (vehicle registration code BZ)

Technology
 .bz, the country code top-level domain for Belize
 bzip2, an algorithm for data compression
 Bugzilla, a web-based error tracker and testing tool
 Busy, in Internet slang (from the pronunciation "bee-zee")
 Toyota bZ series, a family of electric vehicles

Other uses
 Bobby Zamora (born 1981), English footballer nicknamed 'BZ'
 Bravo Zulu, a naval signal meaning 'well done'
 Brent Crude, a trading classification of crude oil (futures trading symbol BZ on the NYMEX exchange)
 Brillouin zone, in mathematics and solid-state physics, a uniquely defined primitive cell in reciprocal space
 Blue Dart Aviation (IATA airline code), a cargo airline based in Chennai, India & Kolkata, India
 Keystone Air Service (1985-2015, IATA airline code), an airline that served Manitoba, Canada
 Squatting movement, in Danish slang, from the word "besæt" ("occupiers")

See also 
 Battlezone (disambiguation)
 Bzzz (disambiguation)